Otto-Rudolf Pärlin (14 August 1887 Torma Parish (now Jõgeva Parish), Kreis Dorpat – 18 August 1964 Tartu) was an Estonian politician. He was a member of I Riigikogu.

References

1887 births
1964 deaths
People from Jõgeva Parish
People from Kreis Dorpat
Farmers' Assemblies politicians
Members of the Riigikogu, 1920–1923
Members of the Riigikogu, 1923–1926
Members of the Riigikogu, 1926–1929
Members of the Estonian National Assembly